Twilight of the Idols is an 1889 book by Friedrich Nietzsche. It may also refer to:

 "Twilight of Idols" (essay), 1917 essay by Randolph Bourne
 Twilight of Idols (Fashion album), 1984 album by new wave band Fashion
 Twilight of the Idols (Gorgoroth album), 2003 album by black metal band Gorgoroth
 Twilight of the Idols (Slough Feg album), 1999 album by heavy metal band Slough Feg

See also
 Twilight of the Gods (disambiguation)